The 1988–89 Chicago Blackhawks season saw the Blackhawks finish in fourth place in the Norris Division with a record of 27 wins, 41 losses, and 12 ties for 66 points. Chicago did not clinch a postseason berth until the season's final game, needing an overtime goal by Troy Murray against the Toronto Maple Leafs. The Blackhawks proceeded to defeat the higher seeded divisional rivals, the Detroit Red Wings and the St. Louis Blues before falling in the Campbell Conference Finals to the eventual Stanley Cup champion Calgary Flames.

Offseason
The biggest move the Blackhawks made on the ice in the offseason was drafting Boston native Jeremy Roenick with the number 8 pick.  Roenick completed his junior year of high school before the draft, and made his NHL debut later that season scoring 18 points in 20 games.  The biggest move the Blackhawks made off the ice was GM Bob Pulford replacing Bob Murdoch as Coach with Mike Keenan.  The Keenan years resulting in some of the most exciting hockey in Chicago since the Hull/Mikita years - both on the ice (as the Hawks would reach the Stanley Cup Finals in 1992) and off the ice (as Keenan feuded with virtually every star on the team). Forward Denis Savard is named team captain.

NHL Draft

Regular season

The Blackhawks had several prolongated losing streaks - opening the season by losing seven of the first nine, then losing nine straight from mid-November to mid-December, then finishing the year losing nine of the last 13.  The Hawks struggled in shorthanded-situations, allowing the most regular season power play goals in the league, with 122.

Offensively, Steve Larmer led the team with 43 goals and 87 points.  Dennis Savard led the team in assists with 59, and was second in overall points with 82.  In January 1988, the Blackhawks acquired Dirk Graham from Minnesota for Curt Fraser, in what would be one of the organization's better trades.  Doug Wilson and Dave Manson led the defense in scoring with 62 and 54 points respectively.

In goal, the Blackhawks struggled to find the right netminder.  Darren Pang started the season but his 4.38 goals against average resulted in only a 10-11-6 record.  The Blackhawks acquired Alain Chevrier from Winnipeg in January 1989 and he fared slightly better with a 3.51 goals against average and a 13-11-2 record.  The Hawks were hoping that 1987's first round draft choice Jim Waite would be the answer, but he failed to win a game, ending with a 0-7-1 record and a 5.22 goals against average.  By year-end, they were forced to rely on an undrafted rookie named Eddie Belfour who only had a 4-12-3 record, but did have a respectable 3.87 goals against average.

In March, with Denis Savard out of the lineup due to injury, coach Mike Keenan named forward Dirk Graham as the new captain. A role Graham would keep, upon Savard's return.

Final standings

Schedule and results

Player stats

Forwards
Note: GP = Games played; G = Goals; A = Assists; Pts = Points; PIM = Penalty minutes

Defensemen
Note: GP = Games played; G = Goals; A = Assists; Pts = Points; PIM = Penalty minutes

Goaltending
Note: GP = Games played; W = Wins; L = Losses; T = Ties; SO = Shutouts; GAA = Goals against average

Playoffs
Despite their awful 27-41-12 record, the Blackhawks made the playoffs by finishing in fourth place in the weak Norris Division after beating the Maple Leafs on the last day of the regular season. After three straight years of first-round defeats in the playoffs, the Blackhawks raised their level of play considerably by stunning the Detroit Red Wings in six games. Denis Savard's 13 points in the series (4 goals and 9 assists) tied a team record shared by Hull and Mikita.
 Norris Division Semi-Finals
Detroit Red Wings vs. Chicago Blackhawks

Chicago wins best-of-seven series 4 games to 2

 Norris Division Finals
Staying hot in the Norris Division Final, the Hawks beat the St. Louis Blues in five games.
 
Chicago Blackhawks vs. St. Louis Blues

Chicago wins best-of-seven series 4 games to 1

 Campbell Conference Finals
After a great playoff run, the Blackhawks Cup dreams ended up in ashes as they were beaten by the eventual Stanley Cup champions Calgary Flames in five games. Denis Savard and Steve Larmer led the team throughout the playoffs averaging more than a point a game. Dave Manson set a team record that still stands with 84 penalty minutes in the playoffs.

Chicago Blackhawks vs. Calgary Flames

Calgary wins best-of-seven series 4 games to 1

References
Blackhawks on Hockey Database

Chic
Chic
Chicago Blackhawks seasons
Chicago
Chicago
1980s in Chicago
1989 in Illinois